This is the discography of Turkish pop group Hepsi, who has released four studio albums and one single on "Stardium Labels".

Hepsi gained fame with their debut album, Bir, and its single "Olmaz Oğlan". The album later produced three more singles: the more successful "Yalan", and Herşeye Rağmen" and "Üç Kalp".

The group then released their first official single, "Tempo".

Then the group released their second studio album, Hepsi 2, also a huge success, which produced two singles: "Kalpsizsin" and "Aşk Sakızı".

They released their third studio album 'Şaka (10+1)'' in May 2008 and have released one single from the album, "4 Peynirli Pizza".

Albums

Charts

B-sides

Music videos

References

External links
 Grup Hepsi 
 Grup Hepsi Official Site 

Discographies of Turkish artists
Hepsi
Pop music group discographies